Hell and Back is a 2015 American stop motion adult animated black comedy fantasy film directed by Tom Gianas and Ross Shuman and written by Gianas, Hugh Sterbakov, and Zeb Wells. It stars the voices of Nick Swardson, Mila Kunis, Bob Odenkirk, T.J. Miller, Rob Riggle, Susan Sarandon, and Danny McBride. It follows three friends who break a blood oath over a mint, causing a portal to open and sucks one of them into hell. This leads to the other two friends going through the portal and must save him from demons, even The Devil himself. The film was released October 2, 2015, by Freestyle Releasing.

Plot

Idealistic carnival barker Remy is desperate to bring in business at a rundown pier carnival alongside his childhood friends, overweight and odd carnival repairman Augie and their insolent assistant manager Curt Myers. After Curt reveals the bank has foreclosed the carnival, a frustrated Remy heads down to the boat of a fortune-teller named Madame Zonar and borrows a book of spells with one page depicting the Devil crying. Remy tells his friends he a business opportunity with the crying devil page while setting the book up for display at The Gates of Hell attraction. When Curt requests a mint Remy has in his possession, Remy forces Curt to take a blood oath on the book so he can pay Remy back with a mint only for Curt to callously admit that he doesn't have a mint. While Remy and Curt argue, Augie sees strange weather before Curt is sucked into a portal within the ride. Remy and Augie take a car from the ride into the portal to rescue Curt, only to find themselves in Hell.

Remy and Augie are discovered by demons and are taken to the Devil as he just came from a meeting. He encounters the duo and while speaking his intent to torture them, mentions the Greek legend Orpheus who has a reputation for bringing mortals out of Hell. He forces the duo to hide when visited by an angel named Barb, with whom he is infatuated. When Barb mentions that she is aware of the mortals in his domain, the Devil tries to win her graces by handing them over. But he discovers that they have escaped and calls out a search for them. Remy and Augie are about to captured by the demons while they use a contraption to escape. But they are saved by a mysterious figure that disposes of a demon stowaway while revealing herself to be a female demon named Deema who Augie becomes infatuated with. She agrees to take them to Curt if they take her to Orpheus by using the Devil's cell phone, which they snagged earlier. Meanwhile, Curt meets the Devil and hits it off with him until learning he is to be ritualistic killed for not living up to his blood oath, Curt persuading the Devil to not sacrifice him via a contract if he puts on a show to win Barb's favor with a replacement sacrifice.

Remy, Augie, and Deema locate the way to Orpheus which is guarded by Deema's mother Durmessa, who warn Deema that Orpheus isn't what she expects him to be as they get past her. They use a submarine and eventually find Orpheus, revealed to be an eccentric slacker who is retired from saving mortals while having one-night stands with numerous women. Annoyed with Orpheus, revealing herself to be his daughter through his fling with Durmessa, Deema leaves with Augie following her upon being fed up with Remy's selfishness. After sharing a romantic moment while on Charon's ferry, they discover from the Devil's cellphone that Curt is being sacrificed at the crossroads and head out to save him. When Remy finds out where Curt is via Orpheus's TV, he leaves to find him and uses a Purgatory boat to catch up with his friends and reconciles with them.

As they haven't found a replacement at the time, the Devil goes back on his deal with Curt and decides to sacrifice him anyway. While the Devil retires to the bathroom after eating Curt's contract, Remy, Augie, and Deema manage to make it past the Demons guarding Curt and reunite with him. They find themselves at the mercy of the demons and the Devil who decides to sacrifice them all. Having a change of heart, Orpheus attempts to rescue them while disguised as the leader of a demon band, but is also captured. Barb, who the Devil called and showed her the mortals, comes to Hell via a stripper's pole and she becomes attracted to Orpheus because of his song when he disguised himself. A jealous Devil tries to use a bazooka cannon full of T-shirts to kill Orpheus, accidentally knocking Barb out as she was getting the group to safety. The group survives the fall, but find themselves in the lower regions of hell full of living sex-offender trees, including one tree who repeatedly raped Orpheus as a child. Seeing the tree to be truly regretful, Orpheus accepts his forgiveness if he rapes the Devil.

Remy, Augie, Curt, and Deema are caught and bounded by the trees and when Remy is eventually held down by roots, Curt, while hanging upside down from a tree, drops a mint onto Remy. Although upset at first about Curt keeping this from him, Remy is told that if he eats the mint, the blood oath will be paid. The Devil and a demon try to stop him, but Remy eats it with him and the others returning to the land of the living with Deema while the Devil is forced to watch Barb fly off with Orpheus as he is being hit on by the tree much to his distress. Finding that Remy's idea to keep the park open succeeded, the group renovated the park six months later to have attractions based on their experience in Hell along with an attraction called the "Gates of Heaven" with Orpheus and Barb in it.

The ending credits show a lost soul in Hell attempting to place an order at Pizza Hut and a Demon who keeps misleading him (as he does this many times in the film) with the occurrences ending with the demon saying "Welcome to Hell".

Cast

 Nick Swardson as Remington "Remy"
 Mila Kunis as Deema
 Bob Odenkirk as The Devil
 T.J. Miller as Augie
 Rob Riggle as Curt Myers
 Susan Sarandon as Barb the Angel
 Danny McBride as Orpheus
 Maria Bamford as Gloria
 Lance Bass as Boy Band Demon
 H. Jon Benjamin as Sex Offender Tree
 Jennifer Coolidge as Durmessa
 John P. Farley as Welcome to Hell Demon
 Jenna Gianas as Hell Announcer
 Dennis Gubbins as Larry the Demon
 Jay Johnston as Rick the Lost Soul
 Kerri Kenney-Silver as Madame Zonar
 Kyle Kinane as Kyle the Demon
 David Koechner as Asmodeus
 Seth Morris as Atheist Lost Soul
 Kumail Nanjiani as Dave the Demon
 Michael Peña as Abigor
 Brian Posehn as Cleb the Carny
 Greg Proops as Asmoday
 Paul Scheer as Head Demon
 J.B. Smoove as Sal the Demon
 Dana Snyder as Garthog
 Paul F. Tompkins as Annoyed Lost Soul
 Nakia Trower as Carnival Patron

Release
In May 2015, Freestyle Releasing acquired distribution rights to the film and set the film for a September 25, 2015 release. However, it was pushed back to October 2, 2015.

Reception

Box office
Hell and Back opened theatrically on October 2, 2015, in 411 venues, earning $104,374 in its opening weekend, ranking number 33 in the domestic box office. As of October 15, the film grossed $157,768.

Critical reception
Bloody Disgusting, a subsidiary of CraveOnline, gave a negative review by criticizing the humor (particularly the drawn-out running gag regarding male rape), but praising the stop-motion animation.

See also
 Robot Chicken

References

External links

 
 
 
 
 

2015 animated films
2015 films
2010s adventure comedy films
2010s American animated films
American adult animated films
2015 comedy horror films
American adventure comedy films
American comedy horror films
American animated comedy films
2010s stop-motion animated films
American black comedy films
Demons in film
The Devil in film
Films set in hell
2015 black comedy films
2010s English-language films
Adult animated comedy films